Nuryn Sanlley Pou (known as La Pinky, September 18, 1952 – April 30, 2012) was a Dominican character and comic actress, best known for her popular character La Pinky, who for more than 25 years was part of the lives of Dominican children.

She died from a brain tumor on the night of April 30, 2012.

Biography
Sanlley was the daughter of Tomás José Sanlley Gómez and Nury Amada Pou Ortiz; from her childhood she loved the acting and singing. Finally in the 70s she began to practice as an actress and singer, participated in programs including El Show del Medio Día beside Roberto Salcedo and Freddy Beras Goico. She retired from the national art media to devote to their children and what became her most famous character, but continued her acting career.

La Pinky was a celebrity since she was an eight-year-old girl, starring Nuryn Sanlley for generations and was part of children's entertainment in the Dominican Republic. It was presented more than 23 times in the Teatro Nacional Eduardo Brito (once per year) which was supported by thousands of children, and had a segment on the Sunday variety program El Gordo de la Semana Freddy Beras Goico. It was characterized by using a red dress with white dots with an unusual make-up.

References

External links
 

1952 births
2012 deaths
People from Santo Domingo
Dominican Republic film actresses
Dominican Republic television actresses
Dominican Republic people of Canarian descent
Dominican Republic people of Catalan descent
Dominican Republic people of Dutch descent
Dominican Republic people of French descent
Dominican Republic people of Peruvian descent
Dominican Republic people of Quechua descent
Deaths from cancer in the Dominican Republic
Deaths from brain tumor
White Dominicans